The smallscale slimehead (Hoplostethus melanopus) is a deepwater fish of the family Trachichthyidae. It can reach sizes of up to  TL. It is a brownish-grey color with blackish fins. It is found in the Indian and Pacific Oceans along the coasts of South Africa, Somalia, the United Arab Emirates, Madagascar, Japan, Indonesia, and Namibia.

References

Hoplostethus
Fish described in 1913
Fish of the Indian Ocean
Fish of the Pacific Ocean